Aldo Bolzan (6 September 1933 – 21 October 2013) was a Luxembourgian professional racing cyclist. He rode in six editions of the Tour de France. Italian by birth, he was naturalized on 22 July 1960.

References

External links
 

1933 births
2013 deaths
Luxembourgian male cyclists
Sportspeople from Esch-sur-Alzette